CSD may refer to:

Finance
 Central securities depository
 Confederate States Dollar
 Serbian dinar, by previous ISO 4217 code

Organizations

Education
 California School for the Deaf (disambiguation), several institutions
 Canyons School District, in Utah, US
 Cheltenham School District, in Pennsylvania, US
 Christina School District, in Delaware, US
 Cleveland School District, in Mississippi, US
 Cordova School District, in Alaska, US

Other organizations
 Canteen Stores Department (India), a chain of stores operated by the Indian Ministry of Defence at military bases
 CSD Pakistan (Canteen Stores Department), a chain of stores operated by the Pakistani Ministry of Defence
 Central securities depository, a body which holds securities such as stocks and bonds for brokers and investors
 Chartered Society of Designers, a British learned society for various kinds of design work
 Commission on Sustainable Development (1992–2013), a former UN agency
 Communication Service for the Deaf, an American non-profit company providing ASL services
 Congress of Democratic Trade Unions (Quebec) (French: Centrale des syndicats démocratiques), a labor organization
 Consejo Superior de Deportes (Higher Sports Council), Spain's national sports agency
 Correctional Services Department Hong Kong Correctional Services, prison agency of Hong Kong
 Czechoslovak State Railways (Czech: Československé státní dráhy) (1918–1939, 1945–1992), former state railroad company

Science and technology

Biology and medicine
 Cat scratch disease, caused by the intracellular bacterium Bartonella henselae
 Chronic subjective dizziness
 Citrus stubborn disease, a plant disease
 Cortical spreading depression
 Communication Sciences and Disorders, a discipline encompassing speech-language pathology, audiology, auditory science, and speech science

Computing and telecommunication
 Canonical signed digit, a system for encoding a floating-point value in two's complement representation
 Circuit Switched Data, for mobile phones
 Client-Side Decoration, GUI design concept that allows a program's interface to adapt to a user's system
 Corrective Service Diskette, an update for a software program

Other sciences and technologies
 Cambridge Structural Database
 Constant speed drive
 Cumulative spectral decay plot, also known as a "waterfall plot"
 Cutter suction dredger, a type of dredger

Other uses
 Cali Swag District, a music group
 Carbonated soft drinks sector of the beverage industry
 Christopher Street Day, an annual European LGBT celebration and demonstration
 Cook, Serve, Delicious! and sequels, a series of cooking simulation video games